Maumere is the administrative seat of the Sikka Regency and the second-largest town (after Ende) on Flores Island, Indonesia. It lies on the north coast of the island and the port is in the north-west part of the town. Administratively the town is not a single district (kecamatan) within the regency, but is divided into three districts – Alok Barat (West Alok), Alok and Alok Timur (East Alok) – although the latter two districts also include a number of substantial islands off the north coast of Flores.

Population
In 1992 Maumere had a total population of about 70,000, but the town suffered considerable damage in the 1992 Flores earthquake and tsunami, with 90 percent of all buildings being destroyed. The Census population in 2010 was 82,039 and 87,720 in 2020.

In 2005, the Roman Catholic Diocese of Maumere was established in the town.

The reefs in areas surrounding Maumere (the Maumere Gulf) were once considered some of the finest diving in the world. However, a 2007 report found that 75% of the coral reefs had been significantly damaged or destroyed by the practice of bomb fishing, the use of toxic chemicals in fishing, and due to earthquakes.
One priority of the local community and government is the promotion of tourism.  An annual cultural event, Maumere in Love, has been initiated as a step towards fostering both local and wider interest in the region around Maumere.

Mother of All Nations
The 6-ton copper-clad statue was constructed on 2005, located at the peak of the  Keli hill, Nilo village, and has become the tallest statue raised in Sikka Regency.

Transportation
The city is served by Frans Xavier Seda Airport or Maumere Airport.

Climate
Maumere has a tropical savanna climate (Köppen Aw) with a long dry season and short wet season.

References

External links
 

Flores Island (Indonesia)
Regency seats of East Nusa Tenggara
Monuments and memorials in Indonesia
East Nusa Tenggara
Populated places in East Nusa Tenggara